Gavin Mullin (born 29 November 1997) is an Irish rugby union player, who is currently a member of the Leinster academy. He plays as a centre and represents UCD in the All-Ireland League. His father is former Ireland international Brendan Mullin.

Early life
Like his father, Mullin attended famed rugby nursery Blackrock College, winning a Leinster Schools Junior Cup medal in 2013. He was also a standout member of the school's unsuccessful 2016 Leinster Schools Rugby Senior Cup side.

Leinster
Mullin joined the Leinster Rugby academy ahead of the 2017–18 season, going on to make his debut for the senior team later that season against Zebre, along with several other academy squad members.

International
Mullin played seven times for the Ireland U-20s across the 2017 Six Nations Under 20s Championship and the 2017 World Rugby Under 20 Championship. In a difficult year for U-20 rugby in Ireland, Mullin was part of the team that lost against hosts the Georgia U-20s for the first ever time, meaning a then joint-worst ever finish of ninth at the World Rugby Under 20 Championship.

Mullin also plays for the Ireland national rugby sevens team. He was a member of the team at the 2020 Summer Olympics in Tokyo, held in 2021 due to Covid.

References

External links
 Leinster Academy Profile
 Pro14 Profile
 
 
 
 

1997 births
Living people
People educated at Blackrock College
Rugby union players from Dublin (city)
Irish rugby union players
University College Dublin R.F.C. players
Leinster Rugby players
Rugby union centres
Olympic rugby sevens players of Ireland
Rugby sevens players at the 2020 Summer Olympics
Ireland international rugby sevens players